Attila Kilvinger (born 27 March 1977) is a Hungarian sprinter. He competed in the men's 4 × 400 metres relay at the 2000 Summer Olympics.

References

1977 births
Living people
Athletes (track and field) at the 2000 Summer Olympics
Hungarian male sprinters
Olympic athletes of Hungary
Place of birth missing (living people)